The Waihua River is a river of the northern Hawke's Bay region of New Zealand's North Island. Its course roughly parallels that of its northern neighbour, the Waiau River. The Waihua rises in rough hill country north of Raupunga, flowing initially east before turning southeast to reach Hawke Bay 15 kilometres west of Wairoa.

See also
List of rivers of New Zealand

References

Rivers of the Hawke's Bay Region
Rivers of New Zealand